Fernando Della Sala (born 10 June 1976) is an Argentine retired footballer who is last known to have played for Club Náutico Rumipal in his home country.

Career

Della Sala started his senior career with Chacarita Juniors in 1997. In 2000, he signed for Inter Turku in the Finnish Veikkausliiga, where he made eighty-two league appearances and scored eight goals. After that, he played for Argentinean clubs Club Náutico Rumipal and Atlético Talleres de Berrotarán before retiring.

References

External links 
 Un futbolista de Villa del Dique en Finlandia 
 Della Sala se queda afuera 
 En Una Baldosa Profile 
 

1976 births
Living people
Argentine footballers
Association football defenders
Argentine expatriate footballers
Argentine people of Italian descent
Veikkausliiga players
FC Inter Turku players
Chacarita Juniors footballers
Expatriate footballers in Finland